Football Club Internazionale Milano S.p.A., also known as Inter or with the commercial name of Inter Women, is an Italian women's association football club based in Milan, section of the homonymous professional football club.

History 
Before the 2018–19 season, Inter only had women's youth teams.

Players

First-team squad 
.

Out on loan 
.

Managerial history
Below is a list of Inter Women coaches from 2018 until the present day.

Honours
Serie B
Winners (1):

See also 
 :Category:Inter Milan (women) players 
 List of women's association football clubs
 List of women's football clubs in Italy

References

External links 
 Official website

 
Women's football clubs in Italy
Association football clubs established in 2018
2018 establishments in Italy
Inter Milan
Football clubs in Milan
Serie A (women's football) clubs